Kotowski, pronounced , is a surname of Polish origin.

Declension 
When referring to a female bearer of this surname, the suffix -ski is replaced with -ska. If several persons are meant, the suffix changes to -scy. The prefix Kot- means cat, while the suffixes indicate that the original bearers had a noble background and were possibly members of the Szlachta during the aristocratic epoch of Poland. Historic bearers of the name were members of several noble crest communities.

People 
 Adam Kotowski (1626–1693), royal cup-bearer at the court of Polish king Jan Sobieski
 Albert Stefan Kotowski (1949), Polish historian and professor at the University of Bydgoszcz
 Alfons Kotowski (1899–1944), leading member of the Polish Home Army in World War II
 Alicja Kotowska (1899–1939), beatified Polish nun
 Damazy Kotowski (1861–1943), Polish artist of the impressionism
 Dan Kotowski (1967), former senator of the Illinois Senate from the 33rd district
 Grigorij Kotowski (1881–1925), Soviet general and communist revolutionary
 Henry Kotowski (1944), German musician and songwriter
 Jan Kotowski (1981), Canadian Crossfit athlete
 Jan Michael Kotowski (1979), German political scientist and lecturer at the University of Santa Cruz
 Konrad Kotowski (1940–2008), German cinematographer and winner of the Locarno film awards
 Konstanty Kotowski (1610–1665), Polish conspirator and leader of the Lithuanian cavalry
 Krzysztof Kotowski (1966), Polish thriller author
 Maciej Kotowski (1975), Canadian economist and professor at the Harvard University
 Mariusz Kotowski (1967), Polish film director and producer
 Michael Franklin Kotowski (1941), former mayor of the city of Campbell, California
 Paweł Kotowski (1777–1849), Polish historian and member of the Piarists
 Włodzimierz Kotowski (1928), Polish chemist and professor at the Technical University of Opole
 Bolesław Kotowski (1920- 1983) Polish Warrior who fought for ENG in the WWII

Places 
 Kotowski Palace, a 17th-century palace in the Polish capitol Warsaw
 Kotowskie, a village in Poland

See also 
Kotovsky (disambiguation)

Polish-language surnames